Winchester services are a pair of motorway service stations, between junctions 8 and 9 of the M3 motorway near Winchester, England which are both operated by Moto Hospitality.

History
After 9 years of planning, the service station was opened in 2001. It was planned and constructed as a joint venture between Extra MSA's owner and RoadChef. On 19 November 2008, Roadchef sold the sites to Moto Hospitality for £9.5 Million.

It is here where presenter of Soccer Saturday, Jeff Stelling, does his research on the week's football as told in his book "Jelleyman's Thrown A Wobbly".

References

External links
Moto Official Site - Winchester
Winchester - Motorway Services Online

2001 establishments in England
Moto motorway service stations
M3 motorway service stations
Buildings and structures in Hampshire
Transport in Hampshire
Services